This is a list of player transfers involving Pro14 rugby union teams between the end of the 2018–19 season and 12 March 2020. Unlike in previous seasons where the bulk of player transfers occurred between seasons, a large number of player transfers instead took place mid-season due to the disruption caused by the coronavirus pandemic.

Benetton

Players in
 Eli Snyman from  Blue Bulls
 Ian Keatley from  London Irish
 Michele Lamaro from  Petrarca
 Charly Trussardi from  Béziers
 Leonardo Sarto from  Leicester Tigers

Players out
 Luca Bigi to  Zebre
 Robert Barbieri retired
 Alberto De Marchi retired
 Tommaso Iannone retired
 Edoardo Gori to  Colomiers
 Andrea Bronzini to  San Donà
 Giorgio Bronzini to  Viadana
 Ornel Gega retired

Cardiff Blues

Players in
 Josh Adams from  Worcester Warriors
 Hallam Amos from  Dragons
 James Botham promoted from Academy
 Kieron Assiratti promoted from Academy
 Shane Lewis-Hughes promoted from Academy
 Will Boyde from  Scarlets
 Jason Tovey from  Dragons
 Rory Thornton from  Ospreys
 Ben Thomas promoted from Academy
 Filo Paulo from  London Irish
 Sam Moore from  Sale Sharks

Players out
 Matthew Rees retired
 Jack Roberts to  Doncaster Knights
 Rhys Carré to  Saracens
 Gareth Anscombe to  Ospreys
 Tom Williams to  Jersey Reds
 George Earle to  Colomiers
 Blaine Scully released
 Ben Jones to  Pontypridd
 Dane Blacker to  Scarlets
 Cameron Lewis to  Wales Sevens
 George Thomas to  Cardiff
 Tom James to  Scarlets
 Sion Bennett to  Valley
 Corey Howells to  Newport

Cheetahs

Players in
 Ruan Pienaar from  Montpellier
 Wilmar Arnoldi from  Griquas
 Chris Massyn from  Stormers
 Chris Smit from  Griquas
 Rhyno Smith from  Sharks
 Duncan Saal from  Stormers
 Craig Barry from  Stormers
 Francois Agenbag from  Free State XV
 Clayton Blommetjies from  Scarlets
 Eddie Davids from  Free State U21
 Lubabalo Dobela from  Free State XV
 Nathan Jordan from  Free State U21
 Sias Koen from  Griquas (season-long loan)
 Rewan Kruger from  Free State U21
 Conan le Fluer from  Free State U21
 JW Meades from  Free State U21
 Keanan Murray from  Free State XV
 Aya Oliphant from  Free State XV
 Ruwald van der Merwe from  Free State U21
 Janus Venter from  Free State XV
 Anthony Volmink from  Griquas (season-long loan)
 George Whitehead from  Griquas (season-long loan)

Players out

 Stephan Malan to  Lazio
 Elandré Huggett released
 Ernst Stapelberg released
 Dennis Visser released
 Jannes Snyman to  Falcons
 Nico Lee to  Brive
 Niell Jordaan to  Griquas
 Louis Conradie to  Otago
 Niell Stannard to  Griffons
 Ntokozo Vidima to  Border Bulldogs
 Quintin Vorster to  Griffons
 Jacques du Toit to  Southern Kings
 Ryno Eksteen released
 Lloyd Greeff released
 Johan Kotze released
 Vuyani Maqina released
 Luigy van Jaarsveld released
 Henco Venter to  Sharks
 Ox Nché to  Sharks
 Shaun Venter to  Ospreys
 Abongile Nonkontwana to  Bulls

Connacht

Players in
 Paul Boyle promoted from Academy
 Paddy McAllister from  Gloucester
 Matthew Burke promoted from Academy
 Conor Fitzgerald promoted from Academy
 Conor Kenny promoted from Academy
 Tom Daly from  Leinster
 Stephen Fitzgerald from  Munster
 Angus Lloyd from  Clontarf
 Rory Burke from  Nottingham
 Stephen Kerins promoted from Academy
 John Porch from  Australia Sevens
 Will Goddard from  Brumbies Academy (short-term deal)

Players out
 Cian Kelleher to  Leinster
 Conor Carey to  Worcester Warriors
 Eoin Griffin retired
 Conor McKeon retired
 James Cannon to  Ealing Trailfinders
 Conán O'Donnell to  Sunwolves
 James Connolly to  Nottingham
 James Mitchell to  Northampton Saints
 Peter Claffey to  Terenure College
 Craig Ronaldson to  Lansdowne

Dragons

Players in
 Sam Davies from  Ospreys
 James McCarthy from  Munster
 Jack Cosgrove from  Worcester Warriors
 Tom Griffiths from  Saracens
 Luke Baldwin from  Worcester Warriors (season long loan)
 Owen Jenkins from  Wales Sevens (short term loan)
 Ben Roach from  Wales Sevens (short term loan)
 Dan Babos promoted from Academy
 Taine Basham promoted from Academy
 Connor Edwards promoted from Academy
 Lennon Greggains promoted from Academy
 Josh Reynolds promoted from Academy
 Max Williams promoted from Academy
 Rio Dyer promoted from Academy
 Conor Maguire from  Old Wesley (short term trial)

Players out
 Gerard Ellis to  Coventry
 Hallam Amos to  Cardiff Blues
 Calvin Wellington to  Sale FC
 Rhodri Davies to  Cornish Pirates
 Gavin Henson retired
 Zane Kirchner released
 Rynard Landman to  Montauban
 Jason Tovey to  Cardiff Blues
 George Gasson to  Wales Sevens
 Dan Suter to  South Canterbury
 Jarryd Sage to  Ampthill
 Henri Williams to  Ampthill
 Tiaan Loots to  Houston SaberCats
 Jack Cosgrove retired

Edinburgh

Players in
 Murray Douglas from  Brumbies (short-term deal)
 Jamie Bhatti from  Glasgow Warriors
 Nick Haining from  Bristol Bears
 Mike Willemse from  Southern Kings
 Eroni Sau from  Perpignan
 Mesulame Kunavula from  Fiji Sevens
 Nic Groom from  Lions
 Ewan Ashman from  Sale Sharks (short-term loan)
 Jamie Farndale from  Scotland Sevens

Players out
 Allan Dell to  London Irish
 Nathan Fowles to  Ealing Trailfinders
 Senitiki Nayalo to  Coventry
 Ross Ford retired
 Tom Brown to  Scotland Sevens
 Luke Hamilton to  NTT DoCoMo Red Hurricanes
 Juan Pablo Socino to  El Salvador
 Sean Kennedy to  Glasgow Warriors
 Darryl Marfo to  Ospreys
 Jack Stanley to  Gloucester

Glasgow Warriors

Players in
 Stafford McDowall promoted from Academy
 Andrew Davidson from  Newcastle Falcons
 Kyle Steyn from  Scotland Sevens
 George Thornton from  Wasps
 Charlie Capps from  Stade Niçois
 Jamie Dobie from  Merchiston Castle School
 Mesu Dolokoto from  Fijian Drua
 Jale Vakaloloma from  Brisbane City
 Sean Kennedy from  Edinburgh
 Aki Seiuli from  Otago
 Leone Nakarawa from  Racing 92

Players out
 Stuart Hogg to  Exeter Chiefs
 Lewis Wynne to  London Scottish
 Jamie Bhatti to  Edinburgh
 James Malcolm to  London Scottish
 Robbie Smith to  Bedford Blues
 Brian Alainu'uese to  Toulon
 Lelia Masaga released
 Kevin Bryce to  Glasgow High Kelvinside
 Alex Dunbar to  Brive

Leinster

Players in
 Cian Kelleher from  Connacht
 Ciarán Frawley promoted from Academy
 Hugo Keenan promoted from Academy
 Rónan Kelleher promoted from Academy
 Conor O'Brien promoted from Academy
 Jimmy O'Brien promoted from Academy
 Hugh O'Sullivan promoted from Academy
 Scott Penny promoted from Academy
 Rowan Osborne from  Dublin University

Players out
 Nick McCarthy to  Munster
 Seán O'Brien to  London Irish
 Jack McGrath to  Ulster
 Tom Daly to  Connacht
 Noel Reid to  Leicester Tigers
 Ian Nagle to  Zebre
 Mick Kearney to  Zebre

Munster

Players in
 Gavin Coombes promoted from Academy
 Shane Daly promoted from Academy
 Nick McCarthy from  Leinster
 Seán O'Connor promoted from Academy
 Craig Casey promoted from Academy
 Jed Holloway from  Waratahs (Two-month contract)

Players out
 Stephen Fitzgerald to  Connacht
 Jaco Taute to  Leicester Tigers
 Duncan Williams released
 Bill Johnston to  Ulster
 James McCarthy to  Dragons
 James Hart to  Biarritz
 Dave O'Callaghan to  Biarritz
 Mike Sherry retired
 Tyler Bleyendaal retired
 Brian Scott retired

Ospreys

Players in
 Gareth Anscombe from  Cardiff Blues
 Harri Morgan promoted from Academy
 Tiaan Thomas-Wheeler promoted from Academy
 Gareth Evans from  Gloucester
 Dewi Lake promoted from Academy
 Morgan Morris promoted from Academy
 Will Griffiths promoted from Academy
 Kieran Williams promoted from Academy
 Shaun Venter from  Cheetahs
 Ben Glynn from  Harlequins
 Marvin Orie from  Lions (short-term deal)
 Marty McKenzie from  Chiefs
 Rhys Fawcett from  Scarlets (season-long loan)
 Simon Gardiner from  Scarlets (season-long loan)
 Darryl Marfo from  Edinburgh
 Cai Evans promoted from Academy

Players out
 Scott Baldwin to  Harlequins
 Joe Thomas to  Otorohanga
 Sam Davies to  Dragons
 Rory Thornton to  Cardiff Blues
 Tom Habberfield to  Cardiff
 Alex Jeffries to  Scarlets
 James Ratti to  Cardiff
 Rob McCusker retired
 Giorgi Nemsadze retired
 Guido Volpi to  Doncaster Knights (season-long loan)

Scarlets

Players in
 Sam Lousi from  Hurricanes
 Dan Davis promoted from Academy
 Dane Blacker from  Cardiff Blues
 Danny Drake from  North Harbour
 Alex Jeffries from  Ospreys
 Tom James from  Cardiff Blues
 Tevita Ratuva from  Bordeaux
 Liam Williams from  Saracens

Players out
 Scott Jenkins to  Bedford Blues
 Tom Price to  Exeter Chiefs
 Will Boyde to  Cardiff Blues
 David Bulbring to  Kubota Spears
 Sam Hidalgo-Clyne to  Racing 92
 Nicky Thomas to  Bristol Bears
 Declan Smith to  Tasman
 Clayton Blommetjies to  Cheetahs
 Rhys Fawcett to  Ospreys (season-long loan)
 Simon Gardiner to  Ospreys (season-long loan)

Southern Kings

Players in
 Jerry Sexton from  Jersey Reds
 Josh Allderman from  Blue Bulls U21
 Christian Ambadiang from  Naka Bulls
 Lusanda Badiyana unattached
 Thembelani Bholi from  Bulls
 Erich Cronjé from  Blue Bulls U21
 Cameron Dawson from  Free State XV
 Andell Loubser from  Blue Bulls U21
 Siya Masuku from  Leopards
 Gavin Mills from  Boland Landbouskool
 Howard Mnisi from  Golden Lions
 Ig Prinsloo from  Naka Bulls
 Christopher Hollis from  NMMU Madibaz
 Josiah Twum-Boafo from  NMMU Madibaz
 Demetri Catrakilis from  Harlequins
 Aston Fortuin from  Blue Bulls XV
 JT Jackson from  Bulls
 Elrigh Louw from  Free State U21
 Jacques du Toit from  Cheetahs

Players out
 Mike Willemse to  Edinburgh
 Berton Klaasen released
 Andisa Ntsila released
 Dries van Schalkwyk released
 Ntabeni Dukisa to  Eastern Province Elephants
 Martin du Toit to  Eastern Province Elephants
 Giant Mtyanda to  Eastern Province Elephants
 Jurie van Vuuren to  Eastern Province Elephants
 Justin Forwood to  Angoulême
 Stephan de Wit to  Eastern Province Elephants
 Luvuyo Pupuma to  Eastern Province Elephants
 Meli Rokoua to  Eastern Province Elephants
 Oliver Zono to  Eastern Province Elephants
 Martin Dreyer released
 Stephan Greeff released
 Harlon Klaasen released
 Bjorn Basson to  Griquas
 Ulrich Beyers released
 Michael Makase released
 Ruan van Rensburg released
 Rudi van Rooyen released

Ulster

Players in
 Sam Carter from  Brumbies
 Michael Lowry promoted from Academy
 Eric O'Sullivan promoted from Academy
 James Hume promoted from Academy
 Gareth Milasinovich from  Worcester Warriors
 Jack McGrath from  Leinster
 Matt Faddes from  Highlanders
 Bill Johnston from  Munster
 Robert Baloucoune promoted from Academy
 Angus Kernohan promoted from Academy
 Zack McCall promoted from Academy
 Marcus Rea promoted from Academy
 David O'Connor from  Lansdowne

Players out
 Alex Thompson to  Jersey Reds
 Darren Cave retired
 Rory Best retired
 Caleb Montgomery to  Worcester Warriors
 David Busby to  Seattle Seawolves
 Peter Nelson released
 Jack Owens released
 Johnny McPhillips to  Leicester Tigers

Zebre

Players in
 Luca Bigi from  Benetton
 Alexandru Țăruș from  Sale Sharks
 Paolo Buonfiglio from  Mogliano
 Junior Laloifi from  Manawatu
 Michelangelo Biondelli from  Fiamme Oro
 Pierre Bruno from  Calvisano
 Danilo Fischetti from  Calvisano
 Enrico Lucchin from  Calvisano
 Marco Manfredi from  Calvisano
 Charlie Walker from  Harlequins
 Ian Nagle from  Leinster
 Mick Kearney from  Leinster
 Lorenzo Masselli from  Lyons Piacenza

Players out
 Matu Tevi released
 Matteo Minozzi to  Wasps 
 Nicolas de Battista to  Cornish Pirates
 Cruze Ah-Nau released
 Dario Chistolini to  Valorugby Emilia 
 Marco Ciccioli to  CASI
 Riccardo Raffaele to  Colorno
 Maicol Azzolini to  Fiamme Oro
 Luhandre Luus to  Valorugby Emilia
 James Brown to  Enisei-STM
  Giovanbattista Venditti to  Avezzano Rugby

See also
List of 2019–20 Premiership Rugby transfers
List of 2019–20 RFU Championship transfers
List of 2019–20 Super Rugby transfers
List of 2019–20 Top 14 transfers
List of 2019–20 Major League Rugby transfers

References

2019–20 Pro14
2019-20